Local government elections were held on 26 March 2012 in Jamaica. Directly elected were 228 divisional councillors and the mayor of the municipality of Portmore. Each of the 13 parish councils and parish capital mayoral positions were allocated to a political party. The election was contested mainly between Jamaica's two major political parties, the Portia Simpson-Miller-led People's National Party (PNP), the opposition, and the Andrew Holness-led Jamaica Labour Party (JLP), which currently forms Jamaica's government.

Councillor candidates are nominated by political parties in the electoral divisions and are voted on and directly elected by the electorate. The mayor of Portmore is also directly elected. Control of the parish councils depends on the party which controls the majority of the divisions within the parish. The post of mayor of the capital town of the parish is awarded to the party which controls the parish council. The party will then appoint one of its councillors in the parish to be mayor of the town. In the case that neither party holds a majority in a parish council, an elected independent or third party candidate will make the decision of which of the tied political parties should be awarded the mayorship of the capital of the parish. In the case that no independent or third party candidates were elected, the mayorship will be dependent on which party received the higher popular vote in the parish.

Background
With local government elections constitutionally due every three years, these elections were due on 5 December 2010. The elections were delayed several times before finally being called by the newly elected PNP government.

These elections followed the 2011 general elections in which the PNP was returned to governance.

Results
The People's National Party secured a landslide victory by winning 151 divisions to the Jamaica Labour Party's 75, in addition to the mayorship of Portmore. The results saw the PNP holding majorities in 12 of the 13 parish councils, with the 13th council, Trelawny, being tied by the two major political parties with one elected independent candidate. It was decided by the independent candidate that the mayorship of Falmouth, the capital of Trelawny, would be awarded to the PNP with the JLP receiving the deputy mayor position.

Councillor election

Parish councils

The party which controls each of the 13 parish councils and appoints a mayor for the capital of the parish is the party which wins the majority of divisions in the parish. In the case that neither party holds a majority in a parish council, an elected independent or third party candidate will make the decision of which of the tied political parties should be awarded the mayorship of the capital of the parish. In the case that no independent or third party candidates were elected, the mayorship will be dependent on which party received the higher popular vote in the parish.

|-
! style="background-color:#E9E9E9;text-align:left;" width=200 |Parish Councils
! style="background-color:#E9E9E9;text-align:right;" |PNP
! style="background-color:#E9E9E9;text-align:right;" |JLP
! style="background-color:#E9E9E9;text-align:right;" |Other
! style="background-color:#E9E9E9;text-align:center;" |Mayorship
! style="background-color:#E9E9E9;text-align:center;" |Deputy Mayorship
|-
| style="text-align:left;" |Kingston and St. Andrew Corporation
| style="text-align:right;" |26
| style="text-align:right;" |14
| style="text-align:right;" |0
| style="text-align:center;" |PNP
| style="text-align:center;" |PNP
|-
| style="text-align:left;" |St. Catherine
| style="text-align:right;" |15
| style="text-align:right;" |14
| style="text-align:right;" |0
| style="text-align:center;" |PNP
| style="text-align:center;" |PNP
|-
| style="text-align:left;" |St. Thomas
| style="text-align:right;" |7
| style="text-align:right;" |3
| style="text-align:right;" |0
| style="text-align:center;" |PNP
| style="text-align:center;" |PNP
|-
| style="text-align:left;" |Portland
| style="text-align:right;" |5
| style="text-align:right;" |4
| style="text-align:right;" |0
| style="text-align:center;" |PNP
| style="text-align:center;" |PNP
|-
| style="text-align:left;" |St. Mary
| style="text-align:right;" |8
| style="text-align:right;" |5
| style="text-align:right;" |0
| style="text-align:center;" |PNP
| style="text-align:center;" |PNP
|-
| style="text-align:left;" |St. Ann
| style="text-align:right;" |11
| style="text-align:right;" |5
| style="text-align:right;" |0
| style="text-align:center;" |PNP
| style="text-align:center;" |PNP
|-
| style="text-align:left;" |Trelawny
| style="text-align:right;" |4
| style="text-align:right;" |4
| style="text-align:right;" |1
| style="text-align:center;" |PNP
| style="text-align:center;" |JLP
|-
| style="text-align:left;" |St. James
| style="text-align:right;" |13
| style="text-align:right;" |4
| style="text-align:right;" |0
| style="text-align:center;" |PNP
| style="text-align:center;" |PNP
|-
| style="text-align:left;" |Hanover
| style="text-align:right;" |5
| style="text-align:right;" |1
| style="text-align:right;" |1
| style="text-align:center;" |PNP
| style="text-align:center;" |PNP
|-
| style="text-align:left;" |Clarendon
| style="text-align:right;" |12
| style="text-align:right;" |10
| style="text-align:right;" |0
| style="text-align:center;" |PNP
| style="text-align:center;" |PNP
|-
| style="text-align:left;" |Manchester
| style="text-align:right;" |11
| style="text-align:right;" |4
| style="text-align:right;" |0
| style="text-align:center;" |PNP
| style="text-align:center;" |PNP
|-
| style="text-align:left;" |St. Elizabeth
| style="text-align:right;" |9
| style="text-align:right;" |6
| style="text-align:right;" |0
| style="text-align:center;" |PNP
| style="text-align:center;" |PNP
|-
| style="text-align:left;" |Westmoreland
| style="text-align:right;" |14
| style="text-align:right;" |0
| style="text-align:right;" |0
| style="text-align:center;" |PNP
| style="text-align:center;" |PNP
|-
| style="text-align:left;background-color:#E9E9E9"|Total
|style="text-align:right;background-color:#E9E9E9"|151
|style="text-align:right;background-color:#E9E9E9"|75
|style="text-align:right;background-color:#E9E9E9"|2
|style="text-align:right;background-color:#E9E9E9"|13(PNP: 13)(JLP: 0)
|style="text-align:right;background-color:#E9E9E9"|13(PNP: 12)(JLP: 1)
|-
| style="text-align:left;" colspan=10 |Source: Jamaica Gleaner
|}

|-
! style="background-color:#E9E9E9;text-align:left;" width=400 |Parties
! style="background-color:#E9E9E9;text-align:center;" |Votes
! style="background-color:#E9E9E9;text-align:right;" |%
! style="background-color:#E9E9E9;text-align:right;" |+/–
! style="background-color:#E9E9E9;text-align:center;" |Electoraldivisions
! style="background-color:#E9E9E9;text-align:right;" |+/–
! style="background-color:#E9E9E9;text-align:center;" |Parishcouncils
! style="background-color:#E9E9E9;text-align:right;" |+/–
! style="background-color:#E9E9E9;text-align:center;" |Mayoralpositions
! style="background-color:#E9E9E9;text-align:right;" |+/–
|-
| style="text-align:left;" |People's National Party
| style="text-align:right;" |318,097
| style="text-align:right;" |55.99
| style="text-align:right;" |+8.47
| style="text-align:right;" |151
| style="text-align:right;" |+57
| style="text-align:right;" |12
| style="text-align:right;" |+9
| style="text-align:right;" |13
| style="text-align:right;" |+10
|-
| style="text-align:left;" |Jamaica Labour Party
| style="text-align:right;" |245,717
| style="text-align:right;" |43.25
| style="text-align:right;" |–9.42
| style="text-align:right;" |75
| style="text-align:right;" |–58
| style="text-align:right;" |0
| style="text-align:right;" |-9
| style="text-align:right;" |0
| style="text-align:right;" |-10
|-
| style="text-align:left;" |Marcus Garvey People's Progressive Party
| style="text-align:right;" |280
| style="text-align:right;" |0.05
| style="text-align:right;" |
| style="text-align:right;" |0
| style="text-align:right;" |NEW
| style="text-align:right;" |0
| style="text-align:right;" |NEW
| style="text-align:right;" |0
| style="text-align:right;" |NEW
|-
| style="text-align:left;" |Independents
| style="text-align:right;" |4,047
| style="text-align:right;" |0.71
| style="text-align:right;" |+0.61
| style="text-align:right;" |2
| style="text-align:right;" |+2
| style="text-align:right;" |0
| style="text-align:right;" |±0
| style="text-align:right;" |0
| style="text-align:right;" |±0
|-
| style="text-align:left;" |Invalid/blank votes
| style="text-align:right;" |
| style="text-align:right;" |–
| style="text-align:right;" |–
| style="text-align:right;" |–
| style="text-align:right;" |–
| style="text-align:right;" |–
| style="text-align:right;" |–
| style="text-align:right;" |–
| style="text-align:right;" |–
|-
| style="text-align:left;background-color:#E9E9E9"|Total (turnout 34.5%)
|style="text-align:right;background-color:#E9E9E9"|568,141
|style="text-align:right;background-color:#E9E9E9"|100
|style="text-align:right;background-color:#E9E9E9"| 
|style="text-align:right;background-color:#E9E9E9"|228
|style="text-align:right;background-color:#E9E9E9"|+1
|style="text-align:right;background-color:#E9E9E9"|13
|style="text-align:right;background-color:#E9E9E9"|±0
|style="text-align:right;background-color:#E9E9E9"|13
|style="text-align:right;background-color:#E9E9E9"|±0
|-
| style="text-align:left;" colspan=10 |Source: Jamaica Gleaner
|}

Portmore mayoral election

The Mayor of Portmore is the chairman of the Portmore Municipal Council, the legislative body for the city. The Mayor is directly elected based on popular vote and is tasked with setting the policies and by-laws that will affect the city, as it relates to: road maintenance, parks, property taxes, etc...

Despite being within the Saint Catherine, due to its population; Portmore was granted city status and 'independence' from the Saint Catherine Parish Council.

References

Jamaica
Elections in Jamaica
2012 in Jamaica